Güzeldere is a village in the Genç District, Bingöl Province, Turkey. The village is populated by Kurds and had a population of 127 in 2021.

The hamlets of Araplı, Çakmaklı, Eyerli, Gürlek, İnandık and Yeniler are attached to the village.

References 

Villages in Genç District
Kurdish settlements in Bingöl Province